Gabrielle Mary Antonia Hoffmann (born January 8, 1982) is an American actress. She initially found success as a child actress, appearing in Field of Dreams,  Uncle Buck, and Sleepless in Seattle, and then later as a teenager with Now and Then, Volcano, All I Wanna Do, and 200 Cigarettes. 

After a hiatus, Hoffmann returned to film acting in 2007, appearing in various independent projects that garnered critical acclaim. This has been described as a career "resurgence", due to her roles in Crystal Fairy & the Magical Cactus with Michael Cera, Wild with Reese Witherspoon, and her leading role in C'mon C'mon alongside Joaquin Phoenix. On television, she starred as Ali Pfefferman in Transparent (2014–2019), which garnered her three Primetime Emmy Award nominations , and appeared as Caroline Sackler in Girls (2014–2017).

Early life 
Hoffmann was born in New York City. Her mother Viva (born Janet Susan Mary Hoffmann) is an actress, writer and former Warhol superstar, and her father, Anthony Herrera, was a soap opera actor best known for his role as James Stenbeck in As the World Turns. Viva and Herrera were estranged shortly after Hoffmann's birth; she was raised by her mother at the Chelsea Hotel in New York. Her father did not have a significant presence in her life. Hoffmann's birth is documented in Pat Hackett's The Andy Warhol Diaries. An entry dated January 10, 1982, two days after Hoffmann was born, says  a friend telephoned Warhol and told him they were going to the Chelsea Hotel to see Viva and her new baby.

Hoffmann's mother, the daughter of an attorney, was raised in a conservative and devoutly Catholic family in New York State. Viva was previously married to director Michel Auder in 1969, by which union Gaby Hoffmann has an elder half-sister, Alexandra "Alex" Auder, who teaches yoga in New York City. Herrera was raised in Wiggins, Mississippi by his maternal grandparents; his own father, Gaby's paternal grandfather, was of French and Spanish descent. Herrera died in 2011 from cancer.

Hoffmann attended elementary school in Manhattan at P.S. 3 on Hudson Street in the West Village, then another school in Hell's Kitchen. After she moved to Los Angeles in 1994, she attended the Buckley School, before finally graduating from Calabasas High School in 1999.

Life at the Chelsea Hotel 
Until July 1993, Hoffmann lived in Manhattan's Chelsea Hotel, which Hoffmann later said she enjoyed. According to Hoffmann, she and her best friend Talya Shomron roller-skated in the hallways, spied on the drug dealer across the hall, and persuaded the bellman to go to the neighborhood delicatessen at night to fetch them ice cream.

Hoffmann recalled, "I grew up in downtown New York in the '80s. I have a friend who grew up with me, and she puts it well. She says, 'If you grew up where we grew up, if you weren't an artist, a drag queen, queer, or a drug addict, then you were the freak.' I grew up in a world where I guess what is considered unusual or abnormal for the rest of America was very much considered the norm." She also reported in an interview that there had been gunfire and a rape at the hotel shortly before they moved out.

Hoffmann and her mother left the Chelsea Hotel after a long-standing dispute with the management that ended in eviction. Regardless, Hoffmann's connection to the hotel had a significant effect on her future. The idea for the 1994 sitcom Someone Like Me originated after Gail Berman (former president of Viacom's Paramount Pictures) read a New York Times article about the hotel which referred to a children's book that Viva and friend Jane Lancellotti wrote, Gaby at the Chelsea (a take on Kay Thompson's 1950s classic Eloise books). Berman became the show's producer.

Adolescence on the West Coast 
After leaving the Chelsea when Hoffmann was 12, she and her mother moved to the west coast to a two-bedroom rented house in Woodland Hills, Los Angeles, California, which was badly damaged in the January 17, 1994 Northridge earthquake. While regrouping their living situation, Hoffmann and her mother temporarily lived at The Oceana Suites Hotel in Santa Monica, California.

College and assorted jobs 
After she graduated from Calabasas High School in 1999, Hoffmann followed her half-sister Alex's example and entered New York's Bard College to pursue a degree in literature and writing. Around 2001, she temporarily left her acting career to complete her studies and graduated in 2004; her senior thesis was a documentary film.

After college, she spent much of her 20s drifting. She interned with a chef in Italy, then trained to be a doula after helping deliver Alex's children. For a time, Hoffmann and a boyfriend lived in an old trailer in the Catskill Mountains.

Career

Childhood acting career 
Hoffmann began acting in commercials at the age of four to help pay the family bills. In 1989, she starred in her first movie, Field of Dreams, with Kevin Costner. 1989's Uncle Buck followed, working beside John Candy and up-and-coming child star Macaulay Culkin. However, she grew tired of the rigors of screen performance and temporarily retired. Nevertheless, upon hearing that Culkin (whom she disliked when they worked together) was making a lot of money in feature films, her "competitive spirit got the best of her", as she later put it, and she reentered the profession. She starred in This Is My Life (1992), Sleepless in Seattle (1993) with Tom Hanks, and The Man Without a Face with Mel Gibson. According to Hoffmann, the praise she received for her performance in This is My Life encouraged her to pursue a full-time acting career in Hollywood as it gave her the confidence she needed to handle major roles.

In 1994, Hoffmann starred in her own sitcom Someone Like Me (on NBC) about a young girl, Gaby, and her dysfunctional family. To promote it, Hoffmann appeared on late-night talk shows like The Tonight Show with Jay Leno and Late Show with David Letterman. Although generally well received, the series lasted only six episodes.

After Someone Like Me, Hoffmann won the lead role opposite Shelley Long in the 1995 TV film Freaky Friday, a remake of the 1976 film of the same name starring Jodie Foster and Barbara Harris. In the same year as Freaky Friday, Hoffmann starred as Young Samantha, the childhood counterpart to Demi Moore's character, in the coming-of-age feature film Now and Then.

In 1995, Hoffmann played Andrea Eagerton in the CBS TV film Whose Daughter Is She?.

Teen and college years: 1996–2003 
Between 1996 and 2001, Hoffmann landed roles in several films including Everyone Says I Love You (1996), Volcano (1997), Snapped (1998),  The Hairy Bird (1998), 200 Cigarettes (1999), Coming Soon (1999), Black & White (1999), You Can Count on Me (2000), and Perfume (2001).

Theatre work in New York: 2003–2007 
Between 2003 and 2007, Hoffmann largely concentrated on a theatre career in New York. Roles included 24 Hour Plays (as Denise at the American Airlines Theatre), The Sugar Syndrome (Williamstown Theatre Festival – July/August 2005), and Third (Mitzi E. Newhouse Theater/Lincoln Center Theater – September – December 2005). In late 2005, she starred in an episode of Law & Order: Criminal Intent. She also appeared in the Broadway play Suburbia, alongside Kieran Culkin and Jessica Capshaw at the Second Stage Theatre on 43rd Street in New York City, which ran from September to October 2006. Hoffmann then returned to the 24 Hours Plays where she acted alongside Jennifer Aniston.

Return to film work: 2007–present 
Since 2007, Hoffmann has made a gradual return to film acting. In 2007, she starred in the film Severed Ways: The Norse Discovery of America. In 2008, she appeared in Guest of Cindy Sherman, a documentary on art-scene commentator Paul Hasegawa-Overacker's relationship with enigmatic photographer Cindy Sherman. Sherman was married to Hoffman's stepfather, Michel Auder, from 1984 to 1999. Later in 2008, Hoffmann appeared in the documentary Chelsea on the Rocks, which is a tribute to the Chelsea Hotel where she grew up. Directed by Abel Ferrara, the documentary highlights the many personalities and artistic voices that have emerged from the legendary residence.

In 2009, Hoffmann had a supporting role in Todd Solondz's Life During Wartime, and the thriller 13 with Mickey Rourke (released in 2010).

Several years later, Hoffmann starred alongside Michael Cera in Crystal Fairy & the Magical Cactus (2013). While shooting the film in Chile, she and Cera took mescaline for her performance in a climactic scene.

Hoffmann has made guest appearances have been in the television series Louie and Girls in Season 3. Hoffmann also appeared in seasons 4 and 5 of Girls.

In 2013, she completed work on the lead role of a Web series entitled Lyle, created by Stewart Thorndike and Jill Soloway. It was shot in NYC. She subsequently acquired an apartment in Brooklyn's Fort Greene section. In October 2013, she starred in the 1910s installment of Vanity Fair'''s The Decades Series, "The First March", directed by Gilly Barnes.

Hoffmann has discussed her full frontal nude scenes in a few of her projects including Crystal Fairy, Girls and the Amazon series Transparent. On nudity, Hoffmann said: "People are obsessed with actresses being hairless, fatless Barbie dolls. They can’t imagine that people would want to be anything other than that. When they are, it's looked at as almost a political statement. Look at Lena Dunham. She is a gorgeous woman and people can't stop talking about how brave she is to show herself naked, which I find totally condescending and ridiculous. If Angelina Jolie was naked onscreen no one would say she was brave. The implication is that Lena's brave because she doesn't look the way she's supposed to look. I think that's a shame."

Jill Soloway wrote the role Hoffmann plays in Transparent for her after seeing her performance on Louis C.K.'s third season of Louie.''

In 2016, she appeared in pre-recorded video as an onstage "stand-in" during Sia's Nostalgic for the Present concert tour, for the song "Unstoppable." Her performance is featured on the song's official music video, released in 2021.

Personal life 
Hoffmann has a daughter, born in 2014, with longtime boyfriend, cinematographer Chris Dapkins (born November 19, 1980). She lives in the Fort Greene neighborhood of Brooklyn.

Filmography

Film

Television

Awards and nominations

References

External links 

 
 

1982 births
Living people
20th-century American actresses
21st-century American actresses
Actresses from New York City
American child actresses
American film actresses
American stage actresses
American television actresses
Bard College alumni
People from Manhattan
People from Fort Greene, Brooklyn